Holcopsis is a genus of horse flies in the family Tabanidae.

Species
Holcopsis bequaerti (Philip, 1943)
Holcopsis bifenestrata (Osten Sacken, 1886)
Holcopsis fenestrata Enderlein, 1923
Holcopsis pilifera (Philip, 1943)

References

Tabanidae
Diptera of North America
Taxa named by Günther Enderlein
Brachycera genera